Guy Camberabero (born 17 March 1936, in Saubion) is a former French rugby union footballer. His position was fly-half.

He played for La Voulte Sportif (one of the predecessor clubs to today's La Voulte-Valence), where he won the French rugby championship, in 1970, and for US Tyrosse.

He had 14 caps for France national team, from 1961 to 1968, scoring 2 tries, 19 conversions, 11 penalties and 11 drop goals, 110 points on aggregate. He had his first cap at the 32-3 loss to New Zealand, in Christchurch, at 19 August 1961, in a tour. He was a winner of the 1966–67 FIRA Nations Cup, playing a single game in the 60-13 win over Italy in 13 March 1967, scoring 27 points. He played twice at the Five Nations Championship, in 1967 and 1968. He won the Grand Slam in the 1968 Five Nations Championship. He had his last cap at the 14-9 win over Wales, in Cardiff, at 23 March 1968, in his final presence at the competition.

He is the brother of fellow French international rugby union player Lilian Camberabero and father of Didier Camberabero.

References

External links
 

1936 births
Living people
French rugby union players
France international rugby union players
Rugby union fly-halves
Sportspeople from Landes (department)